Shelby Series 1 is a high-performance roadster designed by Carroll Shelby and produced by Shelby American.

It was powered by Oldsmobile's 4.0 L L47 Aurora V8 DOHC engine. Top speed is 170 mph (273.5 km/h) ( faster than the 427 Shelby Cobra). There was an optional supercharged version that added $35,100 to the cost of the car, pushing the HP to 450 HP with a 3.2 second 0 to 60 time and a 11.35 second standing 1/4 mile time. Additionally an X50 engine option adding another 50 HP was offered that cost $20,150. The high HP upgrades required heavy duty clutch and brake upgrades as well. It has been reported that only 30 cars were factory supercharged and only 9 had both X50 and supercharger upgrade options.  

The Series 1 is the only car ever designed and engineered by Carroll Shelby from a clean sheet of paper, and built from the ground up.  All other Shelbys are re-engineered models produced by other manufacturers and modified by Shelby.

Prior to production of the Series 1, significant costs were incurred in testing and certification required to conform to 1999 Federal Motor Vehicle Safety Standards. Once completed, a total of 249 production Series 1 were constructed by Shelby American, Inc., all as 1999 models.

During production, Venture Corporation purchased Shelby American, Inc.  The purchase included the Series 1 model, but not the rights to produce the "Continuation Series" Shelby Cobras. In 2004, after a subsequent bankruptcy by Venture Corporation, Carroll Shelby's new company, Shelby Automobiles, Inc., purchased the Series 1 assets for pennies on the dollar. Included in the asset purchase were enough components to produce several more complete Series 1s.

Because the 1999 Federal Motor Vehicle Safety Standards certificate had expired, and the cost to re-certify the car was prohibitive, all Series 1's produced after that date were completed as "component cars" and delivered with no engine or transmission.  Those "component car" models built in 2005 are identified with a seven digit vehicle identification number (VIN) and were designated with a CSX5000 series serial number. The original 249 were production cars with a seventeen digit VIN.

A lot of the interior components came from General Motors, such as a Monsoon premium sound system, an A/M-F/M cassette player and CD player radio from Buick, an instrument cluster and climate controls from Pontiac, and a few other parts.

After the bankruptcy of Venture Corporation, new investors approached Carroll Shelby with plans to build a Series II (a.k.a.: "Series 2").  The design was much like the Series I, but with restyled bumpers, headlamp assemblies, improved powertrain, more horsepower and other refinements.  Three prototype Series II’s were built for introduction at the 2006 Concorso Italiano in Monterey, CA.  They were introduced at a price of $225,000 for the production models.  Orders with deposits were placed for a limited production run.  All but a few production slots sold out in a relatively short time.

After the prototypes were completed and before production began, more restrictive US DOT emission and safety standards became law, pushing the cost of Series II homologation well beyond what was originally anticipated.  With the significant changes and additional testing required to meet new standards, the project ran out of money and was put on hold.  Over $5,000,000 US was invested into the Series 2 project, but only the three Series II prototypes were built.

Technical specifications

The Series 1 was produced in both supercharged and naturally aspirated versions. Supercharged cars were also outfitted by the factory with larger brakes and a heavy duty clutch. Performance is in the "supercar" category with a 0-60 time at 3.2 seconds. Nicely optioned, Series 1 had power steering, power disc brakes, factory air conditioning, Cruise Control, Traction Control, Stability control, power windows, and an AM/FM/CD audio system. The convertible top folded away out of sight in a compartment located behind the cockpit. Some component cars were sold as a roadster with no convertible top.

The Series 1 had dual wishbone suspension with coil-over remote reservoir dampers mounted inboard, and actuated by "rocker arms". The engine was mounted completely behind the front axle and drove a drive shaft supported in a "torque tube" that spun a 6 speed ZF trans-axle specially modified for the Series 1. The chassis was made of extruded and formed 6061 aluminum. It was welded together and then post-heat-treated for maximum strength throughout. Then aluminum honeycomb panels specially designed were bonded into the floor boards and rocker panels for added structure and stiffness. The body panels were carbon fiber and fiberglass laminate. The engine, torque-tube, trans-axle, and damper mounts were all rubber-isolated from the frame. The Goodyear Eagle F1 tires were based on an IMSA racing "rain tire" that had been used for the "show car" model. Goodyear built custom tires for the car.

Other features
Wheels front: 18"x10"
Wheels rear: 18"x12"
Tires front: 265/40 ZR-18
Tires rear: 315/40 ZR-18

References

External links
 Fantasycars.com
 Supercars Site
 Car and Driver- Shelby Series 1 Road Test

Series 1
Roadsters